James Edward Dwyer (born January 3, 1950) is an American former baseball player who was an outfielder for 18 seasons in Major League Baseball (MLB) for seven different teams between  and . Listed at 5' 10", 185 lb., he batted and threw left-handed.

MLB career
A graduate of St. Laurence High School in Burbank, Illinois, just outside Chicago, Dwyer was selected by the St. Louis Cardinals in the  draft out of Southern Illinois University, and he wasted little time in the minor leagues, debuting in the majors on June 10, 1973 with the Cardinals. He became known as a fastball hitter who was used mostly against right-handed pitching, and played all three outfield positions well as a reserve.

Midway through the  season, he was traded to the Montreal Expos (1975–76). The following season, another midseason trade landed him with the New York Mets.

With Baltimore, Dwyer became one of Manager Earl Weaver's key platoon players, primarily used as a corner outfielder, designated hitter and pinch-hitter. In Game 1 on October 11, 1983, Dwyer became the 18th player to hit a home run in his first World Series at-bat when he homered off John Denny for the Orioles' only run in their 2-1 loss to the Philadelphia Phillies.

In a 13–11 loss to the Texas Rangers at Memorial Stadium on August 6, 1986 which was the first-ever game in MLB history that featured three grand slams, Dwyer hit one in the fourth off Jeff Russell after Larry Sheets had done likewise off Bobby Witt earlier in the same inning. Toby Harrah had hit the first one of the contest off Ken Dixon two innings earlier in the second. During the  season he hit a career-high 15 home runs in 241 at-bats. From 1988 to 1990 Dwyer completed his career with stints with the Expos and the Minnesota Twins.

For his career, Dwyer was a .260 hitter (719-for-2761) with 77 home runs and 349 RBI in 1328 games, including 409 runs, 115 doubles, 17 triples, 26 stolen bases, and a .353 on-base percentage. In four postseason games he hit .333 (4-for-12), including one home run, two doubles, four runs, and one RBI.

MLB Career Highlights

While playing for the Expos in 1975, shortly after being traded by the Cardinals, Dwyer was named by MLB as the National League's Player of the Week for the week ending August 3, 1975 with a slash line of .478/.480/.826.
In the heat of the Orioles' 1982 pennant race, Dwyer reached base 13 consecutive times over 4 games against Detroit and Milwaukee.
In July 1983, Dwyer started only 12 games, playing a complete game just four times that month. Even without playing regularly, Dwyer was one of the Baltimore Orioles' hottest hitters during the middle of the 1983 pennant race, leading the team that month in batting average (.474), on-base percentage (.574) and slugging average (1.053).  Dwyer's surge helped the Orioles to a 11-4 record in the games he played.
.*Dwyer was well-known throughout his career as a clutch left-handed pinch hitter, appearing in over 500 games in that role. He is currently 17th on the list of MLB's All-Time Pinch Hit Leaders, garnering career 103 pinch hits, with 10 pinch homers and 74 RBIs.
Although he was the 246th overall pick (11th round) in the MLB draft, Dwyer's perseverance and versatility carried him to an 18-yr. major league career.  In a 2014 essay, noted baseball historian Bill James recognized Dwyer's value by naming him as #4 in his list of "The Greatest Bench Players of All Time."

Coaching career
Following his playing career, Dwyer coached (1991) and managed (1992–94) the Triple A Portland Beavers. In , he became hitting coach of the Minnesota Twins' Double-A affiliate, the New Britain Rock Cats, and remained within the Twins' organization in one capacity or another for the rest of his career. He remained with the Rock Cats through  before becoming the Twins' minor league roving hitting coordinator (-). In 2006, Dwyer became the hitting coach of Minnesota's advanced A affiliate, the Fort Myers Miracle.  He retired in 2016 after 11 years as a coach with the Miracle.

See also

MLB all-time pinch hit leaders

References

External links

Baseball Prospectus
Retrosheet

1950 births
Living people
American expatriate baseball players in Canada
Arkansas Travelers players
Baltimore Orioles players
Baseball coaches from Illinois
Baseball players from Illinois
Boston Red Sox players
Cedar Rapids Cardinals players
Major League Baseball designated hitters
Major League Baseball first basemen
Major League Baseball outfielders
Minnesota Twins players
Minor league baseball coaches
Minor league baseball managers
Modesto Reds players
Montreal Expos players
New York Mets players
People from Evergreen Park, Illinois
Rochester Red Wings players
San Francisco Giants players
St. Louis Cardinals players
Southern Illinois Salukis baseball players
Sun City Rays players
Tidewater Tides players
Tulsa Oilers (baseball) players
Southern Illinois University Carbondale alumni
Wichita Aeros players
Sportspeople from Cook County, Illinois